The UK Rock & Metal Singles Chart is a record chart which ranks the best-selling rock and heavy metal songs in the United Kingdom. Compiled and published by the Official Charts Company, the data is based on each track's weekly physical sales, digital downloads and streams. In 2003, there were 23 singles that topped the 52 published charts. The first number-one single of the year was "Still Waiting" by American pop punk band Sum 41, which spent the first two weeks of the year atop the chart. The final number-one single of the year was "Christmas Time (Don't Let the Bells End)" by glam rock band The Darkness.

The most successful song on the UK Rock & Metal Singles Chart in 2003 was "Bring Me to Life" by Evanescence, which spent ten weeks at number one. The band also topped the chart with "My Immortal". Good Charlotte's "Lifestyles of the Rich and Famous" spent six weeks at number one, with the band also reaching number one with "Girls & Boys" (for three weeks) and "The Anthem" (for two weeks). "I Believe in a Thing Called Love" by The Darkness was number one for six weeks, while "Somewhere I Belong" by Linkin Park spent five weeks atop the chart. "Still Waiting" by Sum 41, "Times Like These" by Foo Fighters and "Fortune Faded" by Red Hot Chili Peppers were all number one for two weeks, while Iron Maiden and Muse spent two weeks at number one in 2003 with two releases each.

Chart history

See also
2003 in British music
List of UK Rock & Metal Albums Chart number ones of 2003

References

External links
Official UK Rock & Metal Singles Chart Top 40 at the Official Charts Company
The Official UK Top 40 Rock Singles at BBC Radio 1

2003 in British music
United Kingdom Rock and Metal Singles
2003